Tourism in Sierra Leone is an important growing national service industry. Beaches and other natural habitats are the biggest parts of the nation's tourism industry.

While visiting Sierra Leone for the first time, there are certain cultural specifics you should know. Sierra Leoneans in general are very friendly and tolerant. Sierra Leone is generally considered as one of the most religiously tolerant countries in the world. Both Muslim and Christian holidays are celebrated with a similar level of enthusiasm, among other things. People in the city are accustomed to treating tourists with a sense of "benefit of the doubt" in situations where a tourist fails to understand a particular way of doing something that is unique to Sierra Leonean culture and traditions. However, as a tourist, you may find yourself having problems with someone who may have noticed you neglecting a particular norm, such as continuously ignoring simple etiquettes like failing to greet properly or not being polite in the traditional way. Many conflict situations could be averted by asking questions about doubtful issues or situations, as many people are always ready to provide you with answers as best as they could.

Tourist industry 
According to the International Labour Organization, approximately 8,000 Sierra Leoneans are employed in the tourism industry, with a growing number of jobs expected to be created in the future. The main entrance point is Freetown International Airport, where transport to and from has been problematic. The government's ministry, the Ministry of Tourism and Cultural Affairs, is headed by Memunatu Pratt.

Attractions
There are a lot of tourist destinations in Sierra Leone. Sierra Leone's Freetown is a favourite destination for tourists. Although the sector was seriously affected during the Civil War; however, there has been a steady improvement in recent years. The city has a lot to offer tourists. There is a vast expanse of beaches stretching along the Freetown Peninsula. The Lumley-Aberdeen beach stretches all the way from Cape Sierra Leone down to Lumley. There are also other popular beaches like the world renowned River Number 2 Beach, Laka Beach, Tokeh Beach, Bureh Beach, and Mama Beach. The Tacugama Chimpanzee Sanctuary, which is located within the peninsula's vast rainforest reserve, just a few miles from the centre of Freetown, has a collection of rare and endangered chimpanzees. Other popular destinations for tourists include the Freetown Cotton Tree, located in Central Freetown, a significant national monument and integral to the founding of the city; Bunce Island, which is a boat ride from the city, is home to the ruins of the slave fortress that was being used during the Transatlantic slave trade; the Sierra Leone Museum, which has a collection of both precolonial as well as colonial artifacts and other items of historical significance; the National Railway Museum; or take a journey around the city's coastline with the popular Sea Coach Express. The Aberdenn-Lumley area is a favourite destination for those venturing into the city's nightlife.

Resources

External links

 Official Web site of the National Tourist Board of Sierra Leone
 Visit Sierra Leone
 Sierra Leone's Okere Adams woos Tourists in London Sierra Leone times, November 17, 2005
 Lush destination opens its doors to visitors once again PMCOMM.com
 Sierra Leone Travel - Africa Tour Operators

 Travel guide to Banana Island Sierra Leone
 Scuba Diving/Accommodation at Banana Island

 
Sierra